This article provides two lists:
A list of National Basketball Association players by total career playoff minutes played.
A progressive list of playoffs minutes played leaders showing how the record increased through the years.

Minutes played leaders
This section provides a list of National Basketball Association players by total career playoff minutes played.

Statistics accurate as of the 2022 NBA playoffs.

Progressive list of playoff minutes played

This is a progressive list of minutes played leaders showing how the record has increased through the years.

Statistics accurate as of the 2022 NBA playoffs.

See also 

List of National Basketball Association career minutes played leaders
List of National Basketball Association annual minutes leaders

References
General

Specific

External links 
NBA & ABA Career Playoff Leaders and Records for Minutes Played at Basketball-Reference.com

National Basketball Association lists
National Basketball Association statistical leaders